Syntypistis comatus is a species of moth of the family Notodontidae first described by John Henry Leech in 1898. It is found in China, Taiwan, India, Myanmar, Thailand, Vietnam, Malaysia, Indonesia the Philippines and New Guinea.

The larvae feed on Pterocarya stenoptera.

References

Moths described in 1898
Notodontidae